Miss Chinese Taipei (or well-known as Miss Taiwan), formerly known as Miss China is a national Beauty pageant in Taiwan ("Chinese Taipei") since 1960.

History

1960–1964
Early in 1960 the Space Mass Communication sponsored the Taipei beauty contest and named as "Miss China". The winners became a talent representative of Chinese culture on world stages such as Miss Universe, Miss World and Miss International as "Miss Republic of China". The pageant existed between 1960-1964. The first title holder of 1960 was Janet Lin Chin-Yi who competed at the first annual Miss International 1960 in Long Beach, United States.

1988–2004
After 24 years Miss Republic of China stopped the annual competition in 1988 the pageant was revived with the 37th Miss Universe on May 24, 1988. Jade Hu Fei-Tsui, Miss Republic of China 1988 competed at the Miss Universe pageant. In 1993 the Miss Taiwan was not held annually. 

With the launch of Miss China World in 2001, political implications forced Miss Taiwan to use the name "Miss Chinese Taipei". The name was first used in the 2004 competition.

Titleholders
The following is a list of all Miss Chinese Taipei (Taiwan) titleholders since 1960.

Big Four pageants representatives
The following women have represented Chinese Taipei in the Big Four international beauty pageants, the four major international beauty pageants for women. These are Miss World, Miss Universe, Miss International and Miss Earth.
'

Miss Universe Chinese Taipei

From 1960 to 2004 the winner of Miss Taiwan represented her country at the Miss Universe. On occasion, when the winner does not qualify (due to age) for either contest, a runner-up is sent.

Miss World Chinese Taipei

From 1960 to 2004 the Runner-up of Miss Taiwan represented her country at the Miss World. In 2005 and 2008 the winner went to Miss World and 2013 there was Miss World official selection to select Taiwanese representatives separately. On occasion, when the winner does not qualify (due to age) for either contest, a runner-up is sent.

Miss International Chinese Taipei

From 1960 to 2004 one of the Runner-ups of Miss Taiwan represented her country at the Miss International. Since 2005 Taiwan set the own winner to Miss International and recent years the Miss Taiwan Beauty Association took over the franchise to the main winner for having chance at Miss International. On occasion, when the winner does not qualify (due to age) for either contest, a runner-up is sent.

Miss Earth Chinese Taipei

Note: From 2001 to 2006, Miss Taiwan used the sash Taiwan R.O.C. In 2007, she used the sash Taiwan. From 2008, Taiwan changed the sash Chinese Taipei.

References

 

Beauty pageants in Taiwan
Recurring events established in 1961
Taiwanese awards
Chinese Taipei
Chinese Taipei